Thuppakki is the soundtrack album, composed by Harris Jayaraj for the 2012 Indian film of the same name.

Background
Thuppakki is Harris Jayaraj's third collaboration with director AR Murugadoss. The soundtrack album consists of seven tracks. The lyrics were written by Pa. Vijay, Na. Muthukumar, Viveka and Madhan Karky, who have written over 35 pallavis for one of the songs. Vijay, seven years after his last attempt at playback singing, and Andrea Jeremiah lent their voices for the track "Google Google", a party number. Though Harris Jayaraj had announced in August that Thuppakki'''s music launch would take place the following month, the audio was eventually released on 10 October 2012, at the Park Sheraton Hotel in Chennai.

Reception
The album received generally positive reviews from critics. Sify wrote: "Overall, it is a classy and refreshing album". Pavithra Srinivasan of Rediff claimed that the music had "nothing new to offer" and that "except Google Google and the mildly melodious Poi Varavaa, the rest are all oft-heard, and seem a mish-mash of his (Jayaraj's) earlier tunes". Top10cinema stated, that each of the songs was "bursting out like a cannon shot". Behindwoods gave it 3.5 out of 5 stars and mentioned: "Overall it’s a good album with tracks that you can trust Vijay to add a lot of weight to with his dancing skills". Indiaglitz gave a 3.5 out of 5 star rating, but cited: "Lots of ammo getting packed, but needs to fire better".

Track listing

References

External links
 Thuppakki (soundtrack)'' at the Internet Movie Database

Tamil film soundtracks
2012 soundtrack albums
Harris Jayaraj albums